Gustavus Town Kirby (January 22, 1874 - February 28, 1956) was the president of the Amateur Athletic Union from 1911 to 1913.  He was on every United States Olympic Committee from 1896 to 1956.   He was chairman of the advisory committee for the Intercollegiate Association of Amateur Athletes of America from 1896 to 1928.

Biography
He was born on January 22, 1874, in Philadelphia, Pennsylvania.

He attended Columbia University, where he was on the track team from 1893 to 1895. While in college he organized a committee to send athletes to the 1896 Summer Olympics. He then attended Columbia University Law School. In 1896 he won the Intercollegiate Fencing Association championship.

Around 1912 he married Wilhelmine Stewart Dunn-Claflin (1885–1941).

He was president of the United States Olympic Committee for the 1920 Summer Olympics and the chairman for the 1924 Summer Olympics.

He became a widower in 1941 when his wife died at the LeRoy Sanitarium in New York City.

He died in Bedford Hills, New York, on February 28, 1956. He was buried in Saint Matthew's Episcopal Churchyard in Bedford, New York.

Footnotes

External links

1874 births
1956 deaths
United States Olympic Committee
Columbia Law School alumni
Columbia University alumni
People from Philadelphia
People from Bedford Hills, New York
19th-century American Episcopalians
20th-century American Episcopalians
American fencers
Presidents of the United States Olympic Committee